Route 37 is a north–south state highway in Connecticut running for  from Route 39 in Danbury, through New Fairfield, to U.S. Route 7 in New Milford. The northernmost section between the town centers of Sherman and New Milford was once part of an early toll road known as the New Milford and Sherman Turnpike chartered in 1818.

Route description

Route 37 begins at an intersection with Route 39 and Route 53 in downtown Danbury, where one can also access I-84 (exit 6). It heads northeast as North Street, crossing under I-84 at exit 7 with access to the eastbound direction only. North of I-84, the road continues as Padanaram Road for about  then shifts to Pembroke Road. Route 37 crosses into the town of New Fairfield after another , as it skirts the banks of the Margerie Lake Reservoir. Route 37 intersects with Route 39 for a second time in New Fairfield center, where the road name changes to Sherman-New Fairfield Road. Route 37 continues through the northwest section of New Fairfield. Along the way it intersects with Patterson Road, an unsigned state highway known as State Road 850, which connects to Putnam County Road 68 in New York state. Route 37 then enters the town of Sherman as Greenwoods Hill Road and passes through the Pootatuck State Forest. Route 37 crosses into the town of New Milford after another . Route 37 ends at U.S. Route 7 in New Milford at the banks of the Housatonic River about  later.

History
The road from New Milford to Sherman to the state line in Pawling, New York was established as a turnpike in 1818, called the New Milford and Sherman Turnpike. It used Housatonic Avenue and Boardman Road in New Milford center, crossing the Housatonic River on the Boardman Bridge. West of the river it used modern Route 37 to reach Sherman center. West of Sherman center, it used Briggs Hill Road to the state line.

The old turnpike (west of the Housatonic River) later became a state highway and given the designation Highway 131 in the early 1920s. At the same time, the Danbury-New Fairfield-Sherman route was designated as Highway 136. Modern Route 37 was created in the 1932 state highway renumbering from old highways 131 and 136 (except for the Briggs Hill Road segment).

Major intersections

References

External links

037
Transportation in Fairfield County, Connecticut
Transportation in Litchfield County, Connecticut
Danbury, Connecticut
New Fairfield, Connecticut